Suicidal ideation, or suicidal thoughts, is the thought process of having ideas, or ruminations about the possibility of ending one's own life. It is not a diagnosis but is a symptom of some mental disorders and can also occur in response to adverse events without the presence of a mental disorder.

On suicide risk scales, the range of suicidal ideation varies from fleeting thoughts to detailed planning. Passive suicidal ideation is thinking about not wanting to live or imagining being dead.  Active suicidal ideation involves preparation to commit suicide or forming a plan to do so.

Most people who have suicidal thoughts do not go on to make suicide attempts, but suicidal thoughts are considered a risk factor. During 2008–09, an estimated 8.3 million adults aged 18 and over in the United States, or 3.7% of the adult U.S. population, reported having suicidal thoughts in the previous year, while an estimated 2.2 million reported having made suicide plans in the previous year. In 2019, 12 million U.S. adults seriously thought about suicide, 3.5 million planned a suicide attempt, 1.4 million attempted suicide, and more than 47,500 died by suicide. Suicidal thoughts are also common among teenagers.

Suicidal ideation is associated with depression and other mood disorders; however, many other mental disorders, life events and family events can increase the risk of suicidal ideation. Mental health researchers indicate that healthcare systems should provide treatment for individuals with suicidal ideation, regardless of diagnosis, because of the risk for suicidal acts and repeated problems associated with suicidal thoughts. There are a number of treatment options for people who experience suicidal ideation.

Definitions
The ICD-11 describes suicidal ideation as "thoughts, ideas, or ruminations about the possibility of ending one's life, ranging from thinking that one would be better off dead to formulation of elaborate plans".

The DSM-5 defines it as "thoughts  about  self-harm, with deliberate consideration or planning of possible techniques of causing one's own death".

The Centers for Disease Control and Prevention defines suicidal ideation "as thinking about, considering, or planning suicide".

Terminology
Another term for suicidal ideation is suicidal thoughts.

When someone who has not shown a history of suicidal ideation experiences a sudden and pronounced thought of performing an act which would necessarily lead to their own death, psychologists call this an intrusive thought. A commonly experienced example of this is the high place phenomenon, also referred to as the call of the void.

Euphemisms related to mortal contemplation include internal struggle, voluntary death, and eating one's gun.

Risk factors

The risk factors for suicidal ideation can be divided into three categories: psychiatric disorders, life events, and family history.

Psychiatric disorders
Suicidal ideation is a symptom for many mental disorders and can occur in response to adverse life events without the presence of a mental disorder.

There are several psychiatric disorders that appear to be comorbid with suicidal ideation or considerably increase the risk of suicidal ideation. For example, many individuals with borderline personality disorder exhibit recurrent suicidal behavior and suicidal thoughts. One study found that 73% of patients with borderline personality disorder have attempted suicide, with the average patient having 3.4 attempts. The following list includes the disorders that have been shown to be the strongest predictors of suicidal ideation. These are not the only disorders that can increase risk of suicidal ideation. The disorders in which risk is increased the greatest include:

 Anxiety disorders
 Autism spectrum disorder
 Major depressive disorder
 Dysthymia
 Bipolar disorder
 Attention deficit hyperactivity disorder (ADHD)
 Premenstrual Dysphoric Disorder (PMDD)
 Post-traumatic stress disorder (PTSD) and complex post-traumatic stress disorder (C-PTSD)
 Personality disorders
 Psychosis (detachment from reality)
 Paranoia
 Schizophrenia
 Substance use disorders, inhalant use disorder
 Body dysmorphic disorder
 Nightmare disorder
 Gender dysphoria
 Conduct disorder
 Specific learning disorder

Medication side effects
Antidepressant medications are commonly used to decrease the symptoms in patients with moderate to severe clinical depression, and some studies indicate a connection between suicidal thoughts and tendencies and taking antidepressants, increasing the risk of suicidal thoughts in some patients.

Some medications, such as selective serotonin re-uptake inhibitors (SSRIs), can have suicidal ideation as a side effect.  Moreover, these drugs' intended effects, can themselves have unintended consequence of an increased individual risk and collective rate of suicidal behavior: Among the set of persons taking the medication, a subset feel bad enough to want to attempt suicide (or to desire the perceived results of suicide) but are inhibited by depression-induced symptoms, such as lack of energy and motivation, from following through with an attempt.  Among this subset, a "sub-subset" may find that the medication alleviates their physiological symptoms (such as lack of energy) and secondary psychological symptoms (e.g., lack of motivation) before or at lower doses than it alleviates their primary psychological symptom of depressed mood. Among this group of persons, the desire for suicide or its effects persists even as major obstacles to suicidal action are removed, with the effect that the incidences of suicide and suicide attempts increase.

In 2003, the U.S. Food and Drug Administration (FDA) issued the agency's strictest warning for manufacturers of all antidepressants (including tricyclic antidepressants [TCAs] and monoamine oxidase inhibitors) due to their association with suicidal thoughts and behaviors. Further studies disagree with the warning, especially when prescribed for adults, claiming more recent studies are inconclusive in the connection between the drugs and suicidal ideation.

Individuals with anxiety disorders who self-medicate with drugs or alcohol may also have an increased likelihood of suicidal ideation.

Life events
Life events are strong predictors of increased risk for suicidal ideation. Furthermore, life events can also lead to or be comorbid with the previous listed psychiatric disorders and predict suicidal ideation through those means. Life events that adults and children face can be dissimilar and for this reason, the list of events that increase risk can vary in adults and children. The life events that have been shown to increase risk most significantly are

 Alcohol use disorder
 Studies have shown that individuals who binge drink, rather than drink socially, tend to have higher rates of suicidal ideation
Certain studies associate those who experience suicidal ideation with higher alcohol consumption
Not only do some studies show that solitary binge drinking can increase suicidal ideation, but there is a positive feedback relationship causing those who have more suicidal ideation to have more drinks per day in a solitary environment
Minoritized gender expression and/or sexuality
 Unemployment
 Chronic illness or pain
 Death of family members or friends
 End of a relationship or being rejected by a romantic interest
Major change in life standard (e.g. relocation abroad)
 Other studies have found that tobacco use is correlated with depression and suicidal ideation
 Unplanned pregnancy
 Bullying, including cyberbullying and workplace bullying
 Previous suicide attempts
 Having previously attempted suicide is one of the strongest indicators of future suicidal ideation or suicide attempts
 Military experience
 Military personnel who show symptoms of PTSD, major depressive disorder, alcohol use disorder, and generalized anxiety disorder show higher levels of suicidal ideation
 Community violence
 Undesired changes in body weight
 Women: increased BMI increases chance of suicidal ideation
 Men: severe decrease in BMI increases chance of suicidal ideation
 In general, the obese population has increased odds of suicidal ideation in relation to individuals that are of average-weight
 Exposure and attention to suicide related images or words

Family history
 Parents with a history of depression
 Valenstein et al. studied 340 adult offspring whose parents had depression in the past. They found that 7% of the offspring had suicidal ideation in the previous month alone 
 Abuse
 Childhood: physical, emotional and sexual abuse
 Adolescence: physical, emotional and sexual abuse
 Family violence
 Childhood residential instability
Certain studies associate those who experience suicidal ideation with family disruption.

Relationships with parents and friends
According to a study conducted by Ruth X. Liu of San Diego State University, a significant connection was found between the parent–child relationships of adolescents in early, middle and late adolescence and their likelihood of suicidal ideation. The study consisted of measuring relationships between mothers and daughters, fathers and sons, mothers and sons, and fathers and daughters. The relationships between fathers and sons during early and middle adolescence show an inverse relationship to suicidal ideation. Closeness with the father in late adolescence is "significantly related to suicidal ideation". Liu goes on to explain the relationship found between closeness with the opposite sex parent and the child's risk of suicidal thoughts. It was found that boys are better protected from suicidal ideation if they are close to their mothers through early and late adolescence; whereas girls are better protected by having a close relationship with their father during middle adolescence.

An article published in 2010 by Zappulla and Pace found that suicidal ideation in adolescent boys is exacerbated by detachment from the parents when depression is already present in the child. Lifetime prevalence estimates of suicidal ideation among nonclinical populations of adolescents generally range from 60% to 75% and in many cases its severity increases the risk of suicide.

Prevention

Early detection and treatment are the best ways to prevent suicidal ideation and suicide attempts. If signs, symptoms, or risk factors are detected early then the individual might seek treatment and help before attempting to take their own life. In a study of individuals who did commit suicide, 91% of them likely had one or more mental illnesses. However, only 35% of those individuals were treated or being treated for a mental illness. This emphasizes the importance of early detection; if a mental illness is detected, it can be treated and controlled to help prevent suicide attempts. Another study investigated strictly suicidal ideation in adolescents. This study found that depression symptoms in adolescents early as 9th grade is a predictor of suicidal ideation. Most people with long-term suicidal ideation do not seek professional help.

The previously mentioned studies point out the difficulty that mental health professionals have in motivating individuals to seek and continue treatment. Ways to increase the number of individuals who seek treatment may include:
 Increasing the availability of therapy treatment in early stage
 Increasing the public's knowledge on when psychiatric help may be beneficial to them
 Those who have adverse life conditions seem to have just as much risk of suicide as those with mental illness

A study conducted by researchers in Australia set out to determine a course of early detection for suicidal ideation in teens stating that "risks associated with suicidality require an immediate focus on diminishing self-harming cognitions so as to ensure safety before attending to the underlying etiology of the behavior". A Psychological Distress scale known as the K10 was administered monthly to a random sample of individuals. According to the results among the 9.9% of individuals who reported "psychological distress (all categories)" 5.1% of the same participants reported suicidal ideation. Participants who scored "very high" on the Psychological Distress scale "were 77 times more likely to report suicidal ideation than those in the low category".

In a one-year study conducted in Finland, 41% of the patients who later committed suicide saw a health care professional, most seeing a psychiatrist. Of those, only 22% discussed suicidal intent on their last office visit. In most of the cases, the office visit took place within a week of the suicide, and most of the victims had a diagnosed depressive disorder.

There are many centers where one can receive aid in the fight against suicidal ideation and suicide. Hemelrijk et al. (2012) found evidence that assisting people with suicidal ideation via the internet versus more direct forms such as phone conversations has a greater effect. In a 2021 research study, Nguyen et al. (2021) propose that maybe the premise that suicidal ideation is a kind of illness has been an obstacle to dealing with suicidal ideation. They use a Bayesian statistical investigation, in conjunction with the mindsponge theory, to explore the processes where mental disorders have played a very minor role and conclude that there are many cases where the suicidal ideation represents a type of cost-benefit analysis for a life/death consideration, and these people may not be called "patients".

Assessment

Assessment seeks to understand an individual by integrating information from multiple sources such as clinical interviews; medical exams and physiological measures; standardized psychometric tests and questionnaires; structured diagnostic interviews; review of records; and collateral interviews.

Interviews
Psychologists, psychiatrists, and other mental health professionals conduct clinical interviews to ascertain the nature of a patient or client's difficulties, including any signs or symptoms of illness the person might exhibit. Clinical interviews are "unstructured" in the sense that each clinician develops a particular approach to asking questions, without necessarily following a predefined format. Structured (or semi-structured) interviews prescribe the questions, their order of presentation, "probes" (queries) if a patient's response is not clear or specific enough, and a method to rate the frequency and intensity of symptoms.

Standardized psychometric measures

 Beck Scale for Suicide Ideation
 Nurses' Global Assessment of Suicide Risk
 Suicidal Affect–Behavior–Cognition Scale (SABCS)
 Columbia Suicide Severity Rating Scale

Treatment

Treatment of suicidal ideation can be problematic due to the fact that several medications have actually been linked to increasing or causing suicidal ideation in patients. Therefore, several alternative means of treating suicidal ideation are often used. The main treatments include: therapy, hospitalization, outpatient treatment, and medication or other modalities.

Therapy

In psychotherapy a person explores the issues that make them feel suicidal and learns skills to help manage emotions more effectively.

Hospitalization

Hospitalization allows the patient to be in a secure, supervised environment to prevent the suicidal ideation from turning into suicide attempts. In most cases, individuals have the freedom to choose which treatment they see fit for themselves. However, there are several circumstances in which individuals can be hospitalized involuntarily. These circumstances are:

 If an individual poses danger to self or others
 If an individual is unable to care for oneself

Hospitalization may also be a treatment option if an individual:

 Has access to lethal means (e.g., a firearm or a stockpile of pills)
 Does not have social support or people to supervise them
 Has a suicide plan
 Has symptoms of a psychiatric disorder (e.g., psychosis, mania, etc.)

Outpatient treatment

Outpatient treatment allows individuals to remain at their place of residence and receive treatment when needed or on a scheduled basis. Being at home may improve quality of life for some patients, because they will have access to their personal belongings, and be able to come and go freely. Before allowing patients the freedom that comes with outpatient treatment, physicians evaluate several factors of the patient. These factors include the patient's level of social support, impulse control and quality of judgment. After the patient passes the evaluation, they are often asked to consent to a "no-harm contract". This is a contract formulated by the physician and the family of the patient. Within the contract, the patient agrees not to harm themself, to continue their visits with the physician, and to contact the physician in times of need. There is some debate as to whether "no-harm" contracts are effective. These patients are then checked on routinely to assure they are maintaining their contract and avoiding dangerous activities (drinking alcohol, driving fast and not wearing a seat belt, etc.).

Medication

Prescribing medication to treat suicidal ideation can be difficult. One reason for this is that many medications lift patients' energy levels before lifting their mood. This puts them at greater risk of following through with attempting suicide. Additionally, if a person has a comorbid psychiatric disorder, it may be difficult to find a medication that addresses both the psychiatric disorder and suicidal ideation.

Antidepressants may be effective. Often, SSRIs are used instead of TCAs as the latter typically have greater harm in overdose.

Antidepressants have been shown to be a very effective means of treating suicidal ideation. One correlational study compared mortality rates due to suicide to the use of SSRI antidepressants in certain counties. The counties which had higher SSRI use had a significantly lower number of deaths caused by suicide. Additionally, an experimental study followed depressed patients for one year. During the first six months of that year, the patients were examined for suicidal behavior including suicidal ideation. The patients were then prescribed antidepressants for the six months following the first six observatory months. During the six months of treatment, experimenters found suicide ideation reduced from 47% of patients down to 14% of patients. Thus, it appears from current research that antidepressants have a helpful effect on the reduction of suicidal ideation.

Although research is largely in favor of the use of antidepressants for the treatment of suicidal ideation, in some cases antidepressants are claimed to be the cause of suicidal ideation. Upon the start of using antidepressants, many clinicians will note that sometimes the sudden onset of suicidal ideation may accompany treatment. This has caused the Food and Drug Administration (FDA) to issue a warning stating that sometimes the use of antidepressants may actually increase suicidal ideation. Medical studies have found antidepressants help treat cases of suicidal ideation and work especially well with psychological therapy. Lithium reduces the risk of suicide in people with mood disorders. Tentative evidence finds clozapine in people with schizophrenia reduces the risk of suicide.

See also
 Existential angst
 Existential crisis
 Existential nihilism
 Finno-Ugrian suicide hypothesis
 Mental health first aid
 Suicide attempt
 Suicide crisis

References

Further reading

External links 

 Evaluation and Treatment of Patients with Suicidal Ideation 
 Suicidal Thought 
 National Suicide Prevention Lifeline: Warning signs 

Anxiety disorders
Attention deficit hyperactivity disorder
Autism spectrum disorders
Borderline personality disorder
Major depressive disorder
Mental disorders
Paranoia
Personality disorders
Post-traumatic stress disorder
Psychosis
Schizophrenia
Substance dependence
Substance-related disorders
Ideation
Symptoms and signs of mental disorders